Taina is an American teen sitcom created by Maria Perez-Brown and starring Christina Vidal. It aired on Nickelodeon from January 14, 2001 until May 11, 2002. Originally taped at Nickelodeon Studios in Orlando, Florida, it was the final sitcom filmed there before moving to Nickelodeon on Sunset for its second season. The series fortunately achieved high ratings.

Premise
Taina Morales is a young Puerto Rican teenager who aspires to be a singer and actress. She and her best friend Renee Jones attend the Manhattan High School of the Performing Arts, where they reunite with Lamar, whom they haven't seen since elementary school. The girls' nemesis Maritza Hogg, who knew them before high school, also attends the performing-arts school and hopes to be a singer/actress. Every episode features Taina daydreaming of eventual superstardom and occasionally performing a new song.

Cast and characters

Main
 Christina Vidal as Taina Maria Morales, a young girl who dreams of becoming a professional singer and actress. She attends a performing arts school with her best friend Renée, rival Maritza, and friends Daniel and Lamar. She and her friends often get themselves into wacky situations in their search for stardom. Though Taina's impatience and impulsiveness occasionally get her into scraps, her honesty and compassion get her out. The name Taina is the female form of the name of the indigenous Puerto Rican people, the Tainos.
 Khaliah Adams as Renée Aretha Jones, Taina's best friend. She is an aspiring comedienne and rapper. A boy-crazy girl, she often helps to ground Taina when her imagination runs away with her. Renée also tends to chase after boys frequently; unfortunately, her love interests aren't the right ones for her.
 Chris Knowings as Lamar Carlos Johnson, Taina's friend and an aspiring director and writer. Not only does he serve as an editor of the performing-art school's newspaper, he also has a crush on Taina and awaits the day she might finally come around. His best friend is Daniel, and the two often join forces to make a quick buck. He serves as a support for Taina and the others, often offering level-headed advice.
 David Oliver Cohen as Daniel Nathaniel McDaniel, a multi-instrumentalist, who also shares the same school locker with Taina. Handsome and opinionated, his loves include writing songs, playing other instruments, and chasing after girls. Daniel prides himself on being quite the ladies' man but often ends up scorned. It's hinted that he had true feelings for Renée. He loves The Beatles, and usually accompanied Taina's songs on his guitar.
 LaTangela Newsome as Maritza Hogg, Taina and Renée's rival. She also aspires to be an actress and singer but tends to be more ruthless than Taina. She loves to upstage others in her quest to become a star. However, she isn't all bad, and sometimes joins forces with Taina and her friends to make money or fight other rivals. She prides herself on being an "evil diva".

Recurring
 Lisa Lisa as Gloria Elana Morales
 Cristina Saralegui as Principal Rojas
 Josh Cruze as Eduardo Morales
 Manolo Villaverde as Gregorio "Abuelo" Sanchez
 Brandon Iglesias as Santito Morales (season 1)
 Selenis Leyva as Titi Rosa
 Joseph Bertot as Hector Colon
 Ruben Rabasa as Papito
 Jacob Urrutia as Santito Morales (season 2)

Development and production
Production on the show began sometime around the summer of 2000. The pilot was partially shot at the Laguardia Performers School in 1999 and finished at Nickelodeon on Sunset. Season 2 was shot from December 2001 – January 6, 2002. The show premiered on January 14, 2001 on Nickelodeon where ratings grew. New episodes would eventually move into the TEENick block at launch on March 4, 2001, starting with its eighth episode  and lasted for two seasons. Taina was scheduled to air every Sunday at 6pm. The show was even put on Nickelodeon's SNICK lineup on Saturday nights from January to May 2002, where ratings more than doubled in its second season. Despite its popularity, (the show garnered Nickelodeon its highest ratings in 3 years) the show was cancelled that summer. CBC reran the show for a few months in 2003.

Cancellation
In July 2002, Nickelodeon quietly cancelled Taina after two seasons. There were reports that the show was only appealing to a female demographic, as well as the show starting to get too expensive to produce (according to Josh Cruze). However, according to Vidal in a 2021 interview, the show was cancelled due to behind-the-scenes business decisions and the network clashing with Vidal's management team, which included her mother. Vidal additionally stated that she believes her then-newly signed recording contract with MCA Records created further dismay for Nickelodeon executives. Scripts for a third season and a made-for-television movie of the series were already written before Nickelodeon cancelled the show. Vidal says Nickelodeon replaced the show with Romeo!

Episodes

Series overview

Season 1 (2001)

Season 2 (2002)

Home releases
The series has seen no DVD releases in North America, however a single-release VHS/DVD was released by Maverick Entertainment in the United Kingdom in March 2004 named "Be Careful What You Wish For"', which features the first four aired episodes.

Current availability
As of June 2022, the original series is not available to stream on Paramount+ in the United States (though available in Spanish in Latin America), where many of its Nickelodeon counterparts can be streamed. The series is, however, available on the Paramount Streaming service Pluto TV as a Spanish-dubbed program. Despite these developments, YouTube remains the only means of viewing the program in its original English language.

Soundtrack
"Taina: Original Television Soundtrack" is the official soundtrack for the series. It was released on February 19, 2002, by Nick Records distributed through now-defunct Jive Records/Zomba Recording Corporation and MTV Networks. The album contains songs featured in the show's second season, such as "Feel Good" and "I'm In Love With Me" and none from the first season, with the exception of "Gonna Be A Star", the show's theme. The songs are performed by the show's stars Christina Vidal and LaTangela with additional songs performed by 3LW and Dream (previously featured on their respective albums 3LW and It Was All a Dream), as members of both groups made appearances during the show's first season. Additionally, the soundtracks boasts writing and production from legendary R&B group and production team Full Force (known for working with show star Lisa Lisa) as well as Nate Butler, Lindy Robbins and Kevin Paige.

 

Note: The album actually credits the artists as their characters with the exception of Dream and 3LW.

Awards and nominations
 ALMA Awards
2002 – Outstanding Children's Television Programming (Won)
2002 – Outstanding Actress in a Television Series – Christina Vidal (Nominated)
2002 – Outstanding Script for a Television Drama or Comedy – Fracaswell Hyman & Maria Perez-Brown for episode "Quinceanero"(Nominated)

References in pop culture
In 2015, American rapper and singer, Shelley FKA DRAM's breakout hit single "Cha Cha" made reference to the titular character in the song's chorus with the lyrics, "...with a Dominican that resembles Taina...". Stating that he enjoys dancing with and entertaining Latina women that resemble Vidal.

References

External links 
 

2001 American television series debuts
2002 American television series endings
2000s American high school television series
2000s American teen sitcoms
2000s Nickelodeon original programming
English-language television shows
Television shows set in New York City
Television series by Nelvana
Television series about teenagers
CBC Television original programming